Edward Skórzewski (6 October 1930 – 8 October 1991) was a Polish film director and screenwriter. He directed 19 films between 1954 and 1973. His 1965 film Three Steps on Earth was entered into the 4th Moscow International Film Festival where it won a Silver Prize.

Selected filmography
 Prawo i pięść (1964)
 Three Steps on Earth (1965)

References

External links

1930 births
1991 deaths
Polish film directors
Film people from Łódź
20th-century Polish screenwriters
Male screenwriters
20th-century Polish male writers